O'Kelley Whitaker (December 26, 1926 – June 25, 2015) was eighth bishop of the Episcopal Diocese of Central New York.

Biography
Whitaker was born in Durham, North Carolina on December 26, 1926. He graduated with a Bachelor of Arts in Philosophy from Duke University in 1949 and then studied at Seabury-Western Theological Seminary. He was ordained deacon and priest in 1952. He served as rector of St Andrew's Church in Charlotte, North Carolina. He also served as a hospital corpsman in the US Navy during WWII. In 1973 he became the Dean of St Luke's Cathedral in Orlando, Florida.

On November 7, 1980, Whitaker was elected Coadjutor Bishop of Central New York during the 112th General Convention which took place in Syracuse, New York. He was consecrated bishop by John Allin, Presiding Bishop, on May 16, 1981, in the Oncenter War Memorial Arena. He was awarded a Doctor of Divinity in 1981 by Seabury-Western. He succeeded as diocesan bishop in 1983 and retired in 1992. Between 1992 and 1997 he served as Assistant Bishop of Southern Virginia.

Works
Whitaker was the author of several hymns and also wrote a book named Sister Death in 1974.

References 
Bishop Coadjutor Consecrated in Syracuse
Bishop Whitaker Dead at 88 obituary from The Living Church

1926 births
2015 deaths
People from Durham, North Carolina
Duke University alumni
20th-century American Episcopalians
Episcopal bishops of Central New York